Rena Jones (born 1977) is an American musician, producer and audio engineer from Portland, Oregon. She composes and produces electro-acoustic, downtempo and ambient music with an emphasis on live string instruments. She has released five solo albums and collaborated on over thirty albums. Her latest album titled Echoes was released in April 2013.

Life and career

Jones grew up in Texas and started on classical violin in third grade. She showed interest in writing music and as a teenager pursued electronic music. She said the freedom and flexibility that electronic music offered was very appealing to her. From 2000 to 2002 she studied sound engineering at Ex'pression College for Digital Arts in Emeryville, California. She then worked as an audio engineer and a musician in the San Francisco area. At Digidesign she worked on the development of the Pro Tools audio software. In 2007 she moved to Portland, Oregon.

Jones plays the cello, violin, keyboards, and programs the synthesizer and drums. Her musical style is based on incorporation and "manipulation of string sounds from real acoustic violins and cellos along with purely electronic beats." She has released five solo albums. Each album has a concept: Transmigration is about reincarnation, Driftwood is about the cycle of life, Indra's Web is about the interconnectedness of reality, and Echoes is about duality, drawing inspiration from Rumi's poetry.

Along with running her own record labels Cartesian Binary Recordings and Pok Pok Records, Jones has composed for film and video games such as Dance Dance Revolution under the name Jena Rose. She was part of the Dance Dance Revolution ULTRAMIX 4 alongside artists Juno Reactor, Prodigy and others. Jones has performed in several electronic music festivals including Shambhala, Burning Man and the Glade.

Two of Jones's albums, Driftwood and Indra's Web, were listed among Echoes radio's top 25 albums of the year in 2006 and 2009, respectively. Her last album, Echoes, features performances by musicians located remotely in London, Los Angeles and Portland, including Sophie Barker, Earl Harvin, Ilya Goldberg, Matt Robertson, Laura Scarborough and Joshua Penman. The album was listed among the top 25 albums of the month by Echoes radio in May and June 2013.

Discography

Solo works

Compilations

Guest appearances

References

External links
Rena Jones, Official Website

Rena Jones on Discogs
Pok Pok Records
Echo Location: Rena Jones' Ambient Chamber Music
Ambient Visions: Talks with Rena Jones, 2007

American cellists
American electronic musicians
American audio engineers
Musicians from Portland, Oregon
Living people
1977 births
Place of birth missing (living people)
Women audio engineers
Downtempo musicians
American women in electronic music
21st-century American musicians
21st-century American women musicians
21st-century cellists